Ascanio Colonna (1560–1608) was an Italian Cardinal who in his lifetime enjoyed a reputation for eloquence and learning.

Life
Colonna was born in Marino on 27 April 1560, the son of Marcantonio Colonna (who commanded the papal flagship at the Battle of Lepanto) and Felice Orsini. He was educated at the University of Alcala and the University of Salamanca, graduating Doctor of both laws.

In 1581, while studying in Spain, he delivered an oration in commemoration of Anna of Austria, Queen of Spain, printed in Salamanca as Oratio in serenissimae Annae Austriacae Hispanarum et Indiarum reginae funere.

On 16 November 1586 he was appointed a cardinal deacon of Santi Vito, Modesto e Crescenzia by Pope Sixtus V, arriving in Rome 17 February 1587. On 14 January 1591 his titular church was altered to Santa Maria in Cosmedin and he was appointed to the Congregation of the Index.

At the death of Philip II of Spain he delivered an Oratio in funere Philippi II, published in Rome in 1599. He was appointed cardinal protector of Flanders, and in 1605 employed the Fleming Philip Rubens as his secretary and librarian.

In January 1606 he became cardinal priest of Santa Croce in Gerusalemme, and in June cardinal bishop of Palestrina and cardinal protector of the Kingdom of Naples. In the same year he intervened in the controversy surrounding the Venetian Interdict with a censure published as Sententia contra reipublicae Venetae episcopos. On 11 June 1606, he was consecrated bishop by Pope Paul V, with Ottavio Bandini, Cardinal-Priest of Santa Sabina, and Carlo Conti, Bishop of Ancona e Numana, serving as co-consecrators.

In failing health, he made his will on 14 June 1607. He died in Rome on 17 May 1608, and was buried in the Lateran Basilica. He was survived by a natural son, Marino. In 1611 his personal library was sold to Giovanni Angelo Altemps.

References

1560 births
1608 deaths
Ascanio
16th-century Italian cardinals
Complutense University of Madrid alumni
University of Salamanca alumni
People from Marino, Lazio
17th-century Italian cardinals